Rickey Thompson (born February 6, 1996) is an American actor, comedian, and Internet personality. He rose to prominence for comedic videos he posts to Instagram, and previously Vine. Thompson starred in the YouTube Red series Foursome (2016-2018).

Early life and career
Thompson grew up in Raleigh, North Carolina. He attended Millbrook High School, where he regularly performed in theater productions and was also bullied for being gay. During this time, Thompson posted YouTube videos about his experience with bullying as well as about fashion. He also used Vine to post comedic videos of himself, usually speaking directly to the camera.

When he was 17, Kylie Jenner shared one of his videos, which led to an increase in his profile on the platform. He amassed 2.5 million followers by the time Vine shut down in 2016. Thompson then began posting short videos to Instagram and continued to grow his social media following. He has monetized his videos with promotional posts and guest appearances at events and in other videos.

Thompson starred in the YouTube web series Foursome from 2016-2018.

In 2018, Thompson narrated several interludes for Aminé's album OnePointFive and also appeared in the "Reel It In" music video. Aminé sent Thompson a direct message on Instagram to invite him to be on the album. That December, he walked in his first runway show for designer Alexander Wang.

Thompson appeared in the 2022 stoner comedy Good Mourning with Machine Gun Kelly and Mod Sun.

Personal life 
Thompson moved to Los Angeles after high school to pursue a career in the entertainment industry and decided to forego college. He also has great interest in fashion.

Thompson is openly gay. He came out on Twitter in 2016.

Filmography

References

External links 

Rickey Thompson on Instagram

Living people
African-American male comedians
American male comedians
African-American male actors
American Internet celebrities
People from Raleigh, North Carolina
LGBT African Americans
American gay actors
LGBT people from North Carolina
LGBT YouTubers
1996 births
Shorty Award winners
20th-century American LGBT people
21st-century American LGBT people